Vilim is both a surname and a given name. Notable people with the name include:

Given name 
William Vilim Feller (1906–1970), Croatian-American mathematician
Vilim Harangozo (1925–1975), Yugoslavia  tennis player 
Vilim Herman (born 1949), Croatian lawyer and politician
Vilim Messner (1904–1988), Croatian athlete
Vilim Posinković (born 1991), Croatian footballer
Vilim Zlomislic, renamed Donald Clarke Andrews, (born 1942), Canadian white supremacist

Surname 
 Rudolf Vilim (born 1913), Swiss canoeist

Croatian masculine given names